The 2012 Oddset Hockey Games was played between 9–12 February 2012. The Czech Republic, Finland, Sweden and Russia played a round-robin for a total of three games per team and six games in total. Five of the matches were played in the Ericsson Globe in Stockholm, Sweden, and one match in the Helsinki Olympic Stadium in Helsinki, Finland. Sweden won the tournament for the second year in a row, after defeating Finland 3–1 on the last game day. The tournament was part of 2011–12 Euro Hockey Tour.

Prior to this year, Sweden Hockey Games was named LG Hockey Games because the tournament was sponsored by LG Electronics. However, after LG decided to drop out their sponsoring, Oddset, a gambling game by Svenska Spel, took over and effectively renamed the tournament to Oddset Hockey Games.

Standings

Games
All times are local (UTC+1 for the games in Sweden, and UTC+2 for the game in Finland).

Scoring leaders
GP = Games played; G = Goals; A = Assists; Pts = Points; +/− = Plus/minus; PIM = Penalties in minutes; POS = PositionSource:

Goaltending leaders
TOI = Time on ice (minutes:seconds); SA = Shots against; GA = Goals against; GAA = Goals against average; Sv% = Save percentage; SO = ShutoutsSource:

Tournament awards
Best players selected by the directorate:
Best Goaltender:       Viktor Fasth
Best Defenceman:       Mattias Ekholm
Best Forward:          Juhamatti Aaltonen
Top Scorer:            Janne Pesonen (3 goals, 0 assists)
Most Valuable Player:  Viktor Fasth

Tournament All-Star Team selected by the media: 
Goaltender:  Viktor Fasth 
Defencemen:  Ossi Väänänen,  Mattias Ekholm 
Forwards:  Juhamatti Aaltonen,  Evgeny Kuznetsov,  Nicklas Danielsson

References

External links
Hockeyarchives 

2011–12 Euro Hockey Tour
2011–12 in Swedish ice hockey
2011–12 in Russian ice hockey
2011–12 in Finnish ice hockey
2011–12 in Czech ice hockey
Sweden Hockey Games
February 2012 sports events in Europe
2010s in Stockholm